In model theory, a discipline within the field of mathematical logic, a tame abstract elementary class is an abstract elementary class (AEC) which satisfies a locality property for types called tameness. Even though it appears implicitly in earlier work of Shelah, tameness as a property of AEC was first isolated by Grossberg and VanDieren, who observed that tame AECs were much easier to handle than general AECs.

Definition 

Let K be an AEC with joint embedding, amalgamation, and no maximal models. Just like in first-order model theory, this implies K has a universal model-homogeneous monster model . Working inside , we can define a semantic notion of types by specifying that two elements a and b have the same type over some base model  if there is an automorphism of the monster model sending a to b fixing  pointwise (note that types can be defined in a similar manner without using a monster model). Such types are called Galois types.

One can ask for such types to be determined by their restriction on a small domain. This gives rise to the notion of tameness:

 An AEC  is tame if there exists a cardinal  such that any two distinct Galois types are already distinct on a submodel of their domain of size . When we want to emphasize , we say  is -tame.

Tame AECs are usually also assumed to satisfy amalgamation.

Discussion and motivation 

While (without the existence of large cardinals) there are examples of non-tame AECs, most of the known natural examples are tame. In addition, the following sufficient conditions for a class to be tame are known:

 Tameness is a large cardinal axiom: There are class-many almost strongly compact cardinals iff any abstract elementary class is tame.
 Conjecture 1.5 in :   If K is categorical in some λ ≥ Hanf(K) then there exists χ < Hanf(K) such that K is χ-tame.

Many results in the model theory of (general) AECs assume weak forms of the Generalized continuum hypothesis and rely on sophisticated combinatorial set-theoretic arguments. On the other hand, the model theory of tame AECs is much easier to develop, as evidenced by the results presented below.

Results 

The following are some important results about tame AECs.

 Upward categoricity transfer: A -tame AEC with amalgamation that is categorical in some successor  (i.e. has exactly one model of size  up to isomorphism) is categorical in all .
 Tameness can be seen as a topological separation principle: An AEC with amalgamation is tame if and only if an appropriate topology on the set of Galois types is Hausdorff.
 Tameness and categoricity imply there is a forking notion: A -tame AEC with amalgamation that is categorical in a cardinal  of cofinality greater than or equal to  has a good frame: a forking-like notion for types of singletons (in particular, it is stable in all cardinals). This gives rise to a well-behaved notion of dimension.

Notes

References

 
 

Boney, Will; Unger Spencer (2015), "Large Cardinal Axioms from Tameness in AECs" arXiv:1509.01191v2.

Model theory
Category theory